Lachamp-Ribennes is a commune in the Lozère department in southern France. It was established on 1 January 2019 by merger of the former communes of Ribennes (the seat) and Lachamp.

See also
Communes of the Lozère department

References

Communes of Lozère